Protti is an Italian surname. Notable people with the surname include:

Aldo Protti (1920–1995), Italian opera singer
Anita Protti (born 1964), Swiss athlete
Igor Protti (born 1967), Italian footballer
Ray Protti, former director of the Canadian Security Intelligence Service (CSIS)

Italian-language surnames